Tea Island is one of the Falkland Islands. It is beside Staats Island, and is just to the south west of Weddell Island. It is shaped like an upside down "h".  It has some of the few examples of Felton's Flower, a rare endemic Falkland species.

References

Islands of the Falkland Islands